Shot Tower Historical State Park is a state park located near the town of Austinville, Virginia.  Its centerpiece is the Jackson Ferry Shot Tower, located along the New River, which was for many years used for the creation of ammunition. The tower is listed on the National Register of Historic Places.

See also
 List of Virginia state parks
 List of Virginia state forests

References

Park website

State parks of Virginia
Industrial buildings and structures on the National Register of Historic Places in Virginia
Parks in Wythe County, Virginia
National Register of Historic Places in Wythe County, Virginia
Protected areas established in 1968
1968 establishments in Virginia